Seniesa Carmen Estrada (born June 26, 1992) is an American professional boxer who has held the WBA minimumweight title since March 2021. She previously held the WBC Silver light flyweight title from 2018 until 2021 and the WBA interim flyweight title from 2019 to 2020. As of September 2020, she is ranked as the world's fifth best active female light flyweight by The Ring and ninth by BoxRec.

Hailing from East Los Angeles, she is of Mexican descent and started boxing at the age of eight.

On July 24, 2020 Estrada scored the fastest knockout in women's boxing history, knocking out 42 year old Miranda Adkins in 7 seconds.

In 2022, Estrada signed a multi-year promotional contract with Top Rank.

Professional boxing record

References

1992 births
Living people
American women boxers
People from East Los Angeles, California
Boxers from Los Angeles
Light-flyweight boxers
Flyweight boxers
National Golden Gloves champions
American boxers of Mexican descent
21st-century American women